The de Bathe baronetcy of Knightstown, Cashel and Ladyrath in the County of Meath was created on 7 July 1801 for James de Bathe. It became extinct upon the death of the 6th baronet, in 1941.

de Bathe baronets of Knightstown, County Meath (1801)

Sir James Michael de Bathe, 1st Baronet (died 22 February 1808)
Sir James Wynne de Bathe, 2nd Baronet (1792–1828); succeeded by his brother
Sir William Plunkett de Bathe, 3rd Baronet (1793–1870)

General Sir (Gerald) Henry Percival de Bathe, 4th Baronet (1823–1907), a long-lived baronet who was present at Queen Victoria's Coronation and funeral in an official capacity. Over objection from her father William Clare, Charlotte Clare lived with de Bathe (1838-1928), for 13 years; they  had nine children—two after they married in 1870.
Sir Hugo de Bathe, below
Henry Percival de Bathe (1860-1909) married 1885 Grace Fanny Denslow Hooper (1867-1957)
Lieutenant-Colonel Maximilian John de Bathe (1869-1927) married 1907 Ada Mary Paget
Mary de Bathe (died 1890, in childbirth), who married Mervyn Henry Archdale, a relative of the Archdale baronets, and had issue; one son and four daughters (the son and a daughter being twins). Their daughter Cicely Archdale (1886 – 11 January 1973) married the 2nd Marquess of Zetland (1876–1971) in 1907, and had one son and two daughters. Another daughter Mary Alice Archdale (died 1962) (a twin with a brother Timothy) married the Third Baron Grimthorpe (1891–1963).
 Phyllis de Bathe, who married 1887 the First Lord Somerleyton (1857–1935); their descendants including the present Third Lord Somerleyton (born 1928), and the heir of Lord Montagu of Beaulieu (whose maternal grandfather was Hon. John de Bathe Crossley).
Olive de Bathe (died 20 December 1939), who on 2 January 1884 married Harry Lawson Webster Levy-Lawson, First and last Viscount Burnham (18 December 1862 – 20 July 1933), elevated to a Viscountcy 1919. She had one daughter.
Patrick Wynne de Bathe (29 April 1876 – 22 April 1939); father of the 6th and last Baronet. He married Violet Lindsay Wood in 1904 (div 1920), daughter of Arthur Nicholas Lindsay Wood, with whom he had one son. Having broken a bigamous wartime engagement to Muriel Perry (breaking her finger in the process of snatching the ring from her hand on the platform of Victoria Station) on his discovery of her illegitimate children (including Sally Grosvenor, Duchess of Westminster) by Roger Ackerley, father also of the writer J. R. Ackerley, he secondly married on 26 July 1921 to Marjorie O'Brien, by whom he had one daughter.
 Sir Christopher Albert de Bathe, 6th Baronet (1905–1941), who succeeded his uncle as Baronet in 1940.
 Bridget de Bathe (b 22 May 1922) who married 1942 Captain Timothy John Gurney, and has issue, including Lucinda Marjorie Gurney, now wife of the 6th Baron Hothfield.
 Winifred de Bathe, called "Mouse" de Bathe by her descendant the Marquess of Bath; she married firstly (div?) Robert Fanning, or William Atmar Fanning, by whom 1 daughter Barbara Fanning, who married five times. Her first husband was the 4th Baron Vivian, whom she married 1903 and divorced 1907 after eloping with another man. Their issue were the 5th Baron Vivian and the novelist Daphne Fielding (1904–1997), who married firstly the 6th Marquess of Bath, and had issue 4 sons including the present Marquess, and 1 daughter, Caroline, late Duchess of Beaufort. She married secondly 5 July 1897 Harry Leslie Blundell McCalmont, (10 May 1861 – 8 December 1902) MP for East Cambridge 1895 to 1902 and a very wealthy man, by whom no issue.
Sir Hugo Gerald de Bathe, 5th Baronet (10 August 1871 – 1940); his first marriage in 1899 was to Lillie Langtry (1853–1929) as her second husband. They were married until her death in 1929. He secondly married on 12 May 1931 at Ajaccio, Corsica was to Deborah Warschowsky, daughter of Samuel Warschowsky, the former wife of Paul Henius. His nephew succeeded due to no issue:
Sir Christopher Albert de Bathe, 6th Baronet (1905–1941), a Pilot Officer, RAFVR; he married 1932 Edna Winifred Terrell; 1 daughter—Charlotte Louise de Bathe (born 1934), since 1967 Mrs Arthur Cyril Bryan.

References

Extinct baronetcies in the Baronetage of the United Kingdom